The Anglo-French Convention of 1882 was signed on 28 June 1882 between Great Britain and France. It confirmed the territorial boundaries between Guinea and Sierra Leone around Conakry and Freetown. However, it was never fully ratified by the French Chamber of Deputies although it was officially recognised by the British Foreign Office.

See also
 Anglo-French Convention of 1889
 Anglo-French Convention of 1898
 Entente Cordiale

References

France–United Kingdom treaties
History of Guinea
1882 in politics
Treaties of the United Kingdom (1801–1922)
Guinea–Sierra Leone border
1882 treaties
Treaties of the French Third Republic
Treaties extended to the Colony of Sierra Leone
Boundary treaties
Unratified treaties
1882 in France
1882 in the United Kingdom
1882 in Africa
June 1882 events